The 2023 FIG World Cup circuit in Rhythmic Gymnastics is a series of competitions officially organized and promoted by the International Gymnastics Federation.

Formats

Medal winners

All-around

Individual

Group

Apparatus

Hoop

Ball

Clubs

Ribbon

5 Hoops

3 Ribbons and 2 Balls

Overall medal table

See also 
 2023 FIG Artistic Gymnastics World Cup series

References 

2023 in gymnastics
Sports events affected by the 2022 Russian invasion of Ukraine
2023